This article lists the squads for the 2013 UEFA European Under-21 Championship that was hosted in Israel. Only players born on or after 1 January 1990 were eligible to play.

Each participating team had to submit a list of forty players, including no fewer than four goalkeepers, thirty days before the opening match. This then had to be reduced to a final squad of 23 players by 26 May 2013. Players born no earlier than 1 January 1990 were eligible for the tournament, meaning some participants were 23 years old as the 'under-21' limit applied at the start of the qualifying competition.

Players in boldface have been capped at full international level at some point in their career.

 Players with a dagger had been given a full international cap by their country prior to the start of the tournament.

Age, caps, goals and club as of 5 June 2013.

Group A

Head coach: Stuart Pearce

England named their squad on 14 May 2013. Callum McManaman was ruled out with injury and replaced by Nathan Delfouneso on 17 May. Andros Townsend and Luke Shaw were replaced by Nathan Redmond and Jack Robinson, due to withdrawal and injury respectively, on 24 May.

Head coach: Guy Luzon

Israel named their squad on 23 May 2013.

Heach coach: Devis Mangia

Italy named their squad on 27 May 2013.

Head coach: Tor Ole Skullerud

Norway named their squad on 22 May 2013. Alexander Groven withdrew from the squad due to injury on 27 May, and was replaced by Markus Henriksen, who had originally been omitted in order to play for the senior side in their World Cup qualifier against Albania on 7 June. Håvard Nordtveit, Valon Berisha and Joshua King were also selected for the qualifier, meaning all four played were ruled out of the opening group game of the tournament.

Group B

Head coach: Rainer Adrion

Germany named a 25-man squad on 16 May 2013. Antonio Rüdiger was added to their squad on 24 May after Jan Kirchhoff was ruled with injury. Germany confirmed their final squad on 28 May, with original party members Tolgay Arslan and Sebastian Jung also out injured.

Head coach: Cor Pot

Netherlands named their squad on 17 May 2013. Jürgen Locadia was ruled out with injury and replaced by Danny Hoesen on 27 May.

Head coach: Nikolai Pisarev

Russia named their squad on 28 May 2013. Alan Dzagoev, Oleg Shatov and Aleksandr Kokorin were all named despite having to miss the opening game in order to play for the full international side. Kokorin was ruled out with injury on 31 May, while Shatov was subsequently released from the senior squad for the start of the tournament.

Head coach: Julen Lopetegui

Spain named their squad on 23 May 2013.

Player statistics
Player representation by club

In total 118 clubs were represented in the tournament.

Player representation by league

The English squad were made up entirely of players from the respective countries domestic leagues. Altogether, there were fifteen national leagues that had players in the tournament.

Average age of squads

Footnotes

References

Squads
UEFA European Under-21 Championship squads